Ekaterina Leonidovna Ivanchikova (Katsiaryna Leanidawna Ivanchykava) (born on ) is a Belarusian singer and vocalist at Belarusian-Russian band IOWA. She was born in Chavusy and is now living in Saint Petersburg.

Career 
Katya's first performance on stage was in 1992 at the regional competition among kindergarteners, while the jury awarded her first place. In school, she was engaged in various kinds of art, including painting, dance, music, piano, and of course, singing. Throughout her adolescence, Ivanchikova was busy writing songs and developing ideas for creating a music group. In 2005 she moved to Minsk for education on linguistics and journalism in BSPU.

IOWA 
IOWA was formed in 2009 in Mahilyow. In 2010, after a series of concerts in St. Petersburg, the group decided to move to St. Petersburg, where the band members live today.

Filmography

Personal life 
12 October 2016 Ekaterina Ivanchikova married IOWA's guitarist Leonid Tereschenko, which met for over 9 years. The wedding took place in Karelia.

References

External links 

21st-century Belarusian women singers
Belarusian emigrants to Russia
1987 births
Living people
Maxim Tank Belarusian State Pedagogical University alumni